The Shivaji Stadium (known as ONGC Shivaji Stadium, following a re-branding) Metro Station is located on the Delhi Airport Express Line of the Delhi Metro.  The station opened on 23 February 2011.

History
The station was opened on 23 February 2011 as Shivaji Stadium metro station. In 2015, the station was renamed to ONGC Shivaji Stadium as part of Delhi Metro's efforts to generate revenue by "semi-renaming" stations.

Station layout

Connections

See also
List of Delhi Metro stations
Transport in Delhi
Delhi Metro Rail Corporation
Delhi Suburban Railway

References

External links

 Delhi Metro Rail Corporation Ltd. (Official site) 
 Delhi Metro Annual Reports
 

Delhi Metro stations
Railway stations in India opened in 2011
Railway stations in New Delhi district
Monuments and memorials to Shivaji